College of the Immaculate Conception, Prague, was a Franciscan College, founded in 1629 by Irish Franciscan priests from Louvain. Instrumental in its foundation was its first Rector Patrick Fleming from Leuven, also involved was Fr Malachy Fallon, the Professor of Theology in Louvain, who persuaded the Holy Roman Emperor Ferdinand II to permit foundation of an Irish College in Prague. The establishment was seen as being part of a re-catholicisation of Bohemia, by the Habsburgs, but also to provide clergy for Ireland.
Shortly after its foundation, Bohemia was invaded during the thirty-years war, Rector of the college Fleming and another Irish friar Mathew Hoare were captured and murdered by Calvinists.

From the legacy of General Walter Butler, a Chapel was built. In 1700 Count Sternburg (Šternberkové), of the Bohemian Noble family, built and stocked a library (from his brothers collection).

The College was suppressed in 1786 by Habsburg Emperor Joseph II, following his Secularization Decrees. In 1787 Students transferred to the Irish College, St Anthony's College, Leuven.

Most of the house and the church are still standing on Hybernska (Hibernian) Street, in Prague, Czech Republic. The building became a Tax office.

People Associated with the College 
 Fr. James Taafe as papal nuncio to Ireland
 Fr. Francis Harold O.F.M, a historian who was professor of theology in prague
 Bishop Anthony MacGeoghegan OFM, served as bishop of Meath and Clonmacnoise 
 Fr. Proinsias Ó Doibhlin, Franciscan friar poet and scribe, also lectured in Prague.
 Bishop James Louis O'Donel OFM, taught theology and philosophy in Prague prior to going to Newfoundland.
 Fr. Anthony O’Neill as guardian in Armagh
 Fr. Philip O’Reilly O.F.M., guardian of the Irish Franciscan house in Prague 
 Bishop Thaddeus Francis O'Rourke, STL, O.F.M. served as Bishop of Killala
 Anthony Bruodin, Irish Franciscan Friar and theologian who taught in Prague

See also
 St Anthony's College, Leuven (Franciscan College in Louvain/Leuven)
 Sant’Isidoro a Capo le Case (Franciscan College in Rome)
 Irish College (Irish Colleges on the Continent)

References

Irish diaspora in Europe
Catholic seminaries
Educational institutions established in the 1600s
Irish Colleges on the Continent